Jaime Ortiz Betancur Airport  is an airport serving the town of Chigorodó in the Antioquia Department of Colombia. The airport is on the north side of the town, across the small Guaduas River, which feeds into the Gulf of Urabá.

See also

Transport in Colombia
List of airports in Colombia

References

External links
OurAirports - Chigorodó
FallingRain - Chigorodó Airport

Airports in Colombia